St James Quarter is a large galleria retail shopping centre and residential development in the centre of Edinburgh, Scotland. It is situated in the east end of the New Town.

History
The site is built on the site of the St. James Centre which closed in October 2016 and the adjoining New St Andrew House office, which was formerly occupied by the Scottish Office.

The retail centre opened on 24 June 2021.

On 29 September 2022, HRH Princess Royal officially opened the development.

Constitute sections

Retail galleria 
The new shopping centre makes space for 850,000 sq. feet (78,967.584 m2) of retail space, with the neighbouring John Lewis & Partners store being the shopping centre's anchor. The retail centre has a capacity of 80 units, alongside a food hall.  A W Hotel, Roomzzz Aparthotel and Everyman Cinema are due to open 2022.

W Hotel 
W Hotels will have a new hotel in the centre of the development.

Transportation 
The development is situated close to both Edinburgh Waverley railway station and St Andrew Square & York Place tram stops, along with multiple bus stops close by.

References 

Shopping centres in Edinburgh
New Town, Edinburgh
2021 establishments in Scotland